Kreul is a German surname. Notable people with the surname include:

Claus Kreul (born 1944), German football player and manager
Richard Kreul (1924–2011), American politician

See also
József Kreul Bugner
Krell (surname)

German-language surnames